Glutamicibacter halophytocola is a Gram-positive, aerobic non-motile bacterium from the genus Glutamicibacter which has been isolated from the roots of the plant Limonium sinense from Lianyungang, China.

References

External links
Type strain of Glutamicibacter halophytocola at BacDive -  the Bacterial Diversity Metadatabase

Bacteria described in 2017
Micrococcaceae